Delanie Rai Gourley (born April 13, 1995) is an American softball pitcher for the USSSA Pride of National Pro Fastpitch. A member of the United States women's national softball team, Gourley played college softball at the University of Florida.

Early life
Gourley was born on April 13, 1995, in Lakeside, California, where she attended El Capitan High School. She graduated in 2013.

College career
Gourley ranked 10th all time in ERA, 2nd in opponent batting average, 5th in winning percentage, 10th in wins, 3rd in saves, 10th in appearances, 8th in shutouts, and 8th in strikeouts during her time at University of Florida. She pitched a no-hitter against Florida A&M on May 19, 2017.

Stats

International career
Gourley was named to the United States women's national softball team roster in 2016. Gourley returned to the team in 2017.  Gourley helped the Red, White, and Blue to a World Cup of Softball Silver Medal in 2016. Gourley helped the team to a Gold Medal at the 2016 Women's Softball World Championship.

Stats

Professional career
Gourley was drafted by the Scrap Yard Dawgs in the 3rd round of the 2017 NPF Draft as the 12th pick overall. She was immediately traded to the Texas Charge for the Charge's 3rd and 5th round picks.

References

1995 births
Living people
Florida Gators softball players
People from Lakeside, California
Softball players from California
Sportspeople from San Diego County, California
USSSA Pride players